Ortonville is the name of several places:

United States
 Ortonville, California
 Ortonville, Michigan
 Ortonville, Minnesota
 Ortonville Township, Big Stone County, Minnesota

Canada
Ortonville, New Brunswick, near Grand Falls